Galo Canote (also known as "Make" or "MakeOne" and "LoveGalo") is an artist mainly known for his graffiti art. As a graffiti artist, he was born in Los Angeles. He also lived in Guadalajara in the mid 1980s.

Career
At an early age, it is said Galo was heavily involved in art. He dropped out of commercial art classes and high school and graffiti became a serious part of his life.

Shortly, upon his return to Los Angeles, he, along with other crew-members and friends, worked on the bandshell of MacArthur Park, in the Los Angeles area. A project directed under Chicana artist Patssi Valdez and the Otis College of Art and Design (then known as Otis Parsons).

Galo left the graffiti scene to pursue other career goals and interests only to return in the 1990s. He currently works as a full-time artist, art & language teacher and mentor for at-risk youth kids and juvenile delinquents. Some of the organizations Galo has worked for are: Art Share LA, Star Education and L.A.'s Best. Galo also directs, organizes and curates art-shows/exhibits throughout the LA area. As an artist, some of the cities or countries he has exhibited in are: Mexico, Japan, Taiwan and Taipei. Some of the art shows he has curated and organized have received worldwide recognition.

Galo is also a food blogger and has become highly recognized and reputable food blogger, specially in or for Koreatown in Los Angeles, California.

He has been a panelist at the Museum of Contemporary Art (MOCA), Los Angeles County Museum of Art (LACMA), galleries and universities such as The Universidad Autonoma de Mexico (UAM) and CalArts.

Some of Galo's clients include: NIKE, Disney, Ford, ESPN, AEG Live, Chivas USA, Jarritos, Novamex, Lionsgate, Dark Castle Entertainment. He has done several school murals for LAUSD.

Galo's most recent project was a 130 foot long by roughly 70 feet wide billboard ad on Sunset Strip. A collaboration with French shoe designer Christian Louboutin and Neiman Marcus to welcome the shoe designer's visit to Los Angeles and celebrate his "20 Years of Glamour".

Quotes
"To answer your question about how I consider myself. I refuse to state what I consider myself. I just consider myself an L.A. Native. But, if I had to answer your question, I'd say that I am L.A.-born with a Mexican heart, a Japanese spirit, and a global mind."
”It interacts all the time. My faith is embedded in me. So I believe I project it either through my art and/or hopefully through my actions.”
The truth is…I don’t even really identify or consider myself an “artist”, at least not the artist the general people have so flagrantly given a loose, misconceived meaning to. That’s what a bunch of wannabe artists who finally have a show/exhibit or what actors who finally get a movie gig like to think of themselves as. I define myself more as a…“hustler.”

See also
Street art

References

External links

Galo Canote on Myspace
Personal Blog

American graffiti artists
American poster artists
Living people
Year of birth missing (living people)